Abolfazl Bahadorani (born 23 August 1978, is an Iranian football goalkeeper who plays for Azadegan League club Foolad Novin. He was signed to Foolad F.C. starting in the season opener in August 2009 but had to leave injured during the first half. He was released by Foolad in July 2010, but has since returned to their reserve side Foolad Novin.

References

1978 births
Living people
Iranian footballers
Association football goalkeepers
Place of birth missing (living people)
Foolad FC players
Naft Masjed Soleyman F.C. players